Tessa Neefjes (born 7 December 1996) is a Dutch racing cyclist, who currently rides for Giant Liv Benelux Offroad Team. She's the 2022 European Champion Mountain bike Beach race and the 2022 Dutch Champion Mountain bike Marathon. In 2022 she won two UCI Gravel World Series races in Millau and Houffalize  and the Dutch Gravel Series.

In 2016 she won the Dutch Road Championships in the category Elite without a contract. Later that year, during a training ride in the Ardennes, she was hit by a truck that drove on the wrong side of the road. The frontal collision caused 16 bone fractures in her back, shoulder, ribs and hand. After her recovery, she chose to ride additional off-road disciplines that she likes the most.

Major results

Road
2016
 1st  Dutch National Champion, Elite without a contract

Mountain biking

2019
 3rd Beach race, UEC European Mountain Bike Championships
2020
 3rd Beach race, National Mountain Bike Championships
 1st Beach races Egmond-pier-Egmond, ’s-Gravenzande, Katwijk, Julianadorp, Rockanje
2021
 3rd Mitas 4 Islands MTB Marathon Stage Race, Croatia, with Rosa van Doorn
2022
 1st  Beach race, UEC European Mountain Bike Championships
 1st  Dutch National Champion Mountain Bike Marathon
 1st Beach race Noordwijk
 2nd Beach race, National Mountain Bike Championships
2023
 2nd Beach race, National Mountain Bike Championships

Gravel
2022
1st Wish One Gravel Race, UCI Gravel World Series Millau
1st Houffa Gravel, UCI Gravel World Series Houffalize
1st Dutch Gravel series overall classification, and the races in Meerveld and Banholt

References

External links
 
 
 

Dutch female cyclists
Living people
1996 births
21st-century Dutch women